JPO may refer to:

 Japan Patent Office
 Javaansche Padvinders Organisatie
 Johannesburg Philharmonic Orchestra
 Johor Premium Outlets
 Junior Professional Officer

See also
 International Journal of Pediatric Obesity
 GPS Joint Program Office, now Global Positioning Systems Directorate